Prof. Mohammed Mustapha Namadi is the former Commissioner for Higher Education and Commissioner for Agriculture and Natural Resources in Kano State, Nigeria.

References

https://www.ajol.info/index.php/ijdmr/search/authors/view?givenName=Mohammed%20Mustapha&familyName=Namadi&affiliation=&country=&authorName=Namadi%2C%20Mohammed%20Mustapha

1959 births
Living people